Tresa is a river in Italy and Switzerland.

Tresa may also refer to
Tresa (name)
Lavena Ponte Tresa, a municipality in Italy
Ponte Tresa, a former municipality in Switzerland 
Tresa, Switzerland, a municipality in Switzerland, which contains Ponte Tresa.
Lugano–Ponte Tresa railway in Switzerland 
Ponte Tresa railway station